This is a list of extinct, endangered and threatened animals of Lithuania. Collection of this list started in 1959 and the current version (2003) contains 815 species: 23 mammals, 75 birds, 128 insects, 224 flowering plants, 199 fungi and lichen.

Mammals

0 (Ex) - Extinct species
 European mink – Mustela lutreola Linnaeus, 1761
 Brown bear – Ursus arctos Linnaeus, 1758
 Garden dormouse – Eliomys quercinus (Linnaeus, 1766)

1(E) - Endangered
 Grey seal – Halichoerus grypus (Fabricius, 1791)
 Lynx – Lynx lynx Linnaeus, 1758 :

2(V) - Vulnerable
 Edible dormouse – Glis glis (Linnaeus, 1766)

3(R) - Rare
 Common pipistrelle – Pipistrellus pipistrellus (Schreber, 1774)
 Northern bat – Eptesicus nilssoni (Keyserling & Blasius, 1839)
 Pond bat – Myotis dasycneme (Boie, 1825)
 Forest dormouse – Dryomys nitedula Pallas, 1778

4(I) - Intermediate
 Leisler's bat – Nyctalus leisleri (Kuhl, 1817)
 Natterer's bat – Myotis nattereri (Kuhl, 1817)
 Brandt's bat – Myotis brandti Eversmann, 1845
 Barbastelle – Barbastella barbastella (Schreber, 1774)
 Common noctule – Nyctalus noctula Schreber, 1774
 Serotine – Eptesicus serotinus (Schreber, 1774)
 Particoloured bat – Vespertilio murinus Linnaeus, 1758

 Northern birch mouse – Sicista betulina Pallas, 1779
 Mountain hare – Lepus timidus Linnaeus, 1758
 Stoat – Mustela erminea Linnaeus, 1758

5(Rs) - Restored
 European otter – Lutra lutra (Linnaeus, 1758)
 Wisent – Bison bonasus (Linnaeus, 1758)

Birds

1(E) - Endangered
 Black-throated diver – Gavia arctica (Linnaeus, 1758)
 Ferruginous duck – Aythya nyroca (Güldenstädt, 1770)
 Red kite – Milvus milvus (Linnaeus, 1758)
 Golden eagle – Aquila chrysaetos (Linnaeus, 1758)
 Greater spotted eagle – Clanga clanga Pallas, 1811
 Short-toed eagle – (Circaetus gallicus (Gmelin, 1788)
 Merlin – Falco columbarius Linnaeus, 1758
 Peregrine falcon – Falco peregrinus Tunstall, 1771
 Willow grouse – Lagopus lagopus (Linnaeus, 1758)
 Northern pintail – Anas acuta Linnaeus, 1758
 Eurasian golden plover – Pluvialis apricaria (Linnaeus, 1758)
 Dunlin – Calidris alpina (Linnaeus, 1758)
 Great snipe – Gallinago media Latham, 1787
 Eurasian eagle-owl – Bubo bubo (Linnaeus, 1758)
 Crested lark – Galerida cristata (Linnaeus, 1758)
 Corn bunting – Miliaria calandra (Linnaeus, 1758)

2(V) - Vulnerable
 Black-necked grebe – Podiceps nigricollis Brehm, 1831
 Gadwall – Anas strepera Linnaeus, 1758
 Steller's eider – Polysticta stelleri (Pallas, 1769)
 Red-breasted merganser – Mergus serrator Linnaeus, 1758
 Black kite – Milvus migrans (Boddaert, 1783)
 White-tailed eagle – Haliaeetus albicilla (Linnaeus, 1758)
 Osprey – Pandion haliaetus (Linnaeus, 1758)
 Capercaillie – Tetrao urogallus Linnaeus, 1758
 Ruff – Philomachus pugnax (Linnaeus, 1758)
 Eurasian curlew – Numenius arquata (Linnaeus, 1758)
 Black-tailed godwit – Limosa limosa (Linnaeus, 1758) Brisson,1760
 Common redshank – Tringa totanus (Linnaeus, 1758)
 Wood sandpiper – Tringa glareola Linnaeus, 1758
 Little tern – Sternula albifrons Pallas, 1764
 Stock dove – Columba oenas Pallas, 1764
 Short-eared owl – Asio flammeus (Pontoppidan, 1763)
 Tengmalm's owl – Aegolius funereus (Linnaeus, 1758)
 European roller – Coracias garrulus Pallas, 1764
 Hoopoe – Upupa epops Pallas, 1764
 Grey-headed woodpecker – Picus canus Gmelin, 1788
 Eurasian three-toed woodpecker – Picoides tridactylus (Linnaeus, 1758)

4(I) - Intermediate
 Little bittern – Ixobrychus minutus (Linnaeus, 1766)
 Lesser white-fronted goose – Anser erythropus (Linnaeus, 1758)
 Northern goshawk – Accipiter gentilis (Linnaeus, 1758)
 Barn owl – Tyto alba (Scopoli, 1769)
 Eurasian pygmy owl – Glaucidium paserinum (Linnaeus, 1758)
 Ural owl – Srix uralensis Pallas, 1771
 Little owl – Athene noctua (Scopoli, 1769)
 Bluethroat – Luscinia svecica (Linnaeus, 1758)
 Ortolan bunting – Emberiza hortulana Linnaeus, 1758

Reptiles

1(E) - Endangered
 European pond turtle – Emys orbicularis (Linnaeus, 1758)
 Smooth snake – Coronella austriaca Laurenti, 1768

Amphibians

3(R) - Rare
 European tree frog – Hyla arborea (Linnaeus, 1758)

4(I) - Intermediate
 Great crested newt – Triturus cristatus (Laurenti, 1768)
 European fire-bellied toad – Bombina bombina (Linnaeus, 1761)

5(Rs) - Restored
 Natterjack toad – Bufo calamita (Laurenti, 1768)

Fish

0 (Ex) - Extinct species
 Common sturgeon of Europe – Acipenser sturio Linnaeus, 1758
 Zope – Ballerus ballerus (Linnaeus, 1758)

1(E) - Endangered
 Sea lamprey – Petromyzon marinus Linnaeus, 1758

3(R) - Rare
 Twait shad – Alosa fallax Lacépède, 1800
 Common nase – Chondrostoma nasus (Linnaeus, 1758)

4(I) - Indeterminate
 Atlantic salmon – Salmo salar Linnaeus, 1758
 Common whitefish – Coregonus lavaretus holsatus Thienemann, 1916
 European weather loach – Misgurnus fossilis (Linnaeus, 1758)

Mollusk

0 (Ex) - Extinct species
 Freshwater pearl mussel – Margaritifera margaritifera Linnaeus, 1758

2(V) - Vulnerable
 (roundback slug species) Arion empiricorum Férussac, 1819
 Great grey slug – Limax maximus Linnaeus, 1758
 Swollen river mussel – Unio tumidus (Linnaeus, 1758)

Spiders

3(R) - Rare
 Philaeus chrysops (Poda, 1761)
 Dolomedes plantarius (Clerck, 1757)
 Arctosa cinerea Fabricius, 1777
 Eresus cinnaberinus (Olivier, 1789)

Insects

0 (Ex) - Extinct species
 Lucanus cervus (Linnaeus, 1758)
 Hamearis lucina (Linnaeus, 1758)
 Lithostege griseata (Denis & Schiffermüller, 1775)
 Xylocopa valga Gerstaecker, 1872

1(E) - Endangered
 Cerambyx cerdo L.

3(R) - Rare
 Ephemerella karelica Tiens.
 Capnopsis schilleri Rostock.
 Cordulegaster boltoni Don.
 Sphingonotus caerulans L.
 Podisma pedestris L.
 Cicadetta montana Scop.
 Cicindela maritima Dej.
 Calosoma inquisitor L.
 Calosoma sycophanta L.
 Carabus coriaceus L.
 Carabus nitens L.
 Carabus intricatus L.
 Agonum ericeti Panz.
 Xylodrepa quadripunctata L.
 Ceruchus chrysomelinus Hoch.
 Polyphylla fullo L.
 Gnorimus variabilis L.
 Osmoderma eremita Scop.
 Netocia lugubris Herbst
 Peltis grossa L.
 Ergates faber L.
 Prionus coriarius L.
 Anostirus purpureus Poda
 Cassida margaritacea Schall
 Philopotamus montanus Don.
 Apatania zonella L.
 Semblis phalaenoides L.
 Jutta arctic Oeneis jutta Hbn.
 Tree grayling Hipparchia statilinus Hfn.
 Twin-spot fritillary Brenthis hecate D. & S.
 Marbled fritillary Brenthis daphne D. & S.
 Frigga's fritillary Clossiana frigga Thnbg.
 False heath fritillary Melitaea diamina Lang.
 Nickerl's fritillary Melitaea aurelia Nick.
 Marsh fritillary Euphydryas aurinia Rtt.
 Scarce fritillary Euphydryas maturna L.
 Violet copper Lycaena hele D. & S.
 Scarce large blue Maculinea teleius Bergstr.
 Large blue Maculinea arion L.
 Green-underside blue Glaucopsyche alexis Poda
 Eastern baton blue Pseudophilotes vicrama Moore
 Turquoise blue Polyommatus dorylas D. & S.
 Chequered skipper Carterocephalus palaemon Pall.
 Dingy skipper Erynnis tages L.
 Olive skipper Pyrgus serratulae Ramb.
 Endrosa roscida D. & S.
 Cream-spot tiger Arctia villica L.
 Ammobiota festiva Hfn.
 Hyphoraia aulica L.
 Zygaena ephialtes L.
 Zygaena angelicae Och.
 Thaumetopoea pinivora Tr.
 Synanthedon mesiaeformis H.-S.
 Synanthedon vespiformis L.
 Synanthedon conopiformis Esp.
 Agrotis ripae Hb.
 Cucullia balsamitae Bsd.
 Dicycla oo L.
 Mesoligia literosa Hw.
 Photedes brevilinea Fenn
 Baptria tibiale Esp.
 Semiothisa carbonaria Cl.
 Aspitates gilvaria D. & S.
 Ennomos quercinaria Hfn.
 Epirrhoe tartuensis Moels
 Eupithecia thalictrata Pung.
 Bembix rostrata L.
 Scolia hirta Schr.
 Podalonia luffii Saund.
 Colletes caspicus balticus Alflcen
 Andrena nasuta Giraud
 Andrena curvungula Thomson
 Andrena suerinensis Friese
 Melitturga clavicornis Latr.
 Melitta wankowiczi Radosz.
 Dasypoda argentata Panz.
 Lasioglossum prasinum Smith
 Anthophora plagiata Ill.
 Tetralonia macroglossa Ill.
 Bombus semenoviellus Skorikov
 Bombus pomorum Panz.
 Bombus confusus Schr.

4(I) - Indeterminate
 Brachycercus pallidus Tshern.
 Leucorhoenanthus maximus Joly.
 Anax imperator Leach.
 Anax parthenope Selys.
 Labidura riparia Pall.
 Boros schneideri Panz.
 Old World swallowtail Papilio machaon L.
 Clouded Apollo Parnassius mnemosyne L.
 Scarce heath Coenonympha hero L.
 Large copper Lycaena dispar Hw.
 Chalkhill blue Polyommatus coridon Poda
 Cinnabar moth Thyria jacobaea L.
 Chersotis cuprea D. & S.
 Ipimorpha contusa Frr.
 Plusia zosimi Hb.
 Phibalapteryx virgata Hfn.
 Chariaspilates formosaria Ev.
 Andrena rugulosa Stoeckhert
 Andrenosoma albibarbe Meig.
 Andrenosoma atra L.
 Pogonota barbata Ztt.

Crustaceans

1(E) - Endangered
 Monoporeia affinis (Lindström)

2(V) - Vulnerable
 Triops cancriformis (Bosc)
 Lepidurus apus (L.)
 Tanymastix stagnalis (L.)
 Mysis relicta Lovén
 Limnocalanus macrurus G. O. Sars
 Eurytemora lacustris (Poppe)

Leech

2(V) - Vulnerable
 Medicinal leech (Hirudo medicinalis L.)

Flowering plants

0 (Ex) - Extinct species
 Trapa natans L. (water caltrop)
 Aldrovanda vesiculosa L.
 Rubus arcticus L.
 Veratrum lobelianum Bernh.
 Pedicularis kaufmannii Pinzger
 Groenlandia densa (L.) Fourr.
 Hypericum humifusum L. (trailing St.John's-wort)
 Caldesia parnassifolia (L.) Parl.
 Gladiolus palustris Gaudin (marsh gladiolus)
 Aphanes arvensis L. (parsley piert)
 Hydrocotyle vulgaris L. (marsh pennywort)
 Pycreus flavescens (L.) P. Beauv. ex Rchb.
 Carex rhizina Blytt ex Lindblom

1(E) - Endangered
 Epipogium aphyllum Sw.
 Sea aster (Aster tripolium L.)
 Teucrium scordium L.
 Dwarf birch (Betula nana L.)
 Isopyrum thalictroides L.
 Bromopsis erecta (Huds.) Fourr.
 Erica tetralix L.
 Cephalanthera longifolia (L.) Fritsch
 Red helleborine (Cephalanthera rubra (L.) Rich.)
 Hedera helix L.
 Western marsh orchid (Dactylorhiza majalis (Rchb.) P. F. Hunt & Summerh.)
 Dactylorhiza cruenta (O. F. Müll.) Soó
 Orchis ustulata L.
 Marsh gentian (Gentiana pneumonanthe L.)
 Gentianella uliginosa (Willd.) Börner
 Pedicularis sceptrum-carolinum L.
 Pedicularis sylvatica L.
 Deptford pink (Dianthus armeria L.)
 Large pink (Dianthus superbus L.)
 Creeping willow (Salix repens L.)
 Conifer bedstraw (Galium triflorum Michx.)
 Lobelia dortmanna L.
 Musk orchid (Herminium monorchis (L.) R. Br.)
 Melittis melissophyllum L.
 Hordelymus europaeus (L.) Harz
 Fen violet (Viola persicifolia Schreb.)
 Fly orchid (Ophrys insectifera L.)
 Sea-milkwort (Glaux maritima L.)
 Nymphoides peltata (S. G. Gmel.) Kuntze
 Gymnadenia odoratissima (L.) Rich.
 Neottianthe cucullata (L.) Schltr.
 Potamogeton trichoides Cham. & Schltdl.
 Slender naiad (Najas flexilis (Willd.) Rostk. & W. L. E. Schmidt)
 Najas minor All.
 Myriophyllum alterniflorum DC.
 Tofieldia calyculata (L.) Wahlenb.
 Gnaphalium luteoalbum L.
 Hedge hyssop (Gratiola officinalis L.)
 Succisella inflexa (Kluk) Beck
 Drosera intermedia Hayne
 Centaurium littorale (Turner ex Sm.) Gillmour
 Carex davalliana Sm.
 Carex magellanica Lam.
 Schoenus ferrugineus L.
 Saltmarsh rush (Juncus gerardii Loisel.)
 Moor rush (Juncus stygius L.)
 Sea holly (Eryngium maritimum L.)
 Dracocephalum ruyschiana L.

2(V) - Vulnerable
 Arnica montana L.
 Seseli annuum L.
 Centaurea phrygia L.
 Betula humilis Schrank
 Allium vineale L.
 Bromopsis benekenii (Lange) Holub
 Salsola kali L.
 Neottia cordata (L.) R. Br.
 Hydrilla verticillata (L. f.) Royle
 Malaxis monophyllos (L.) Sw.
 Dactylorhiza maculata (L.) Soó
 Orchis morio L.
 Orchis militaris L.
 Orchis mascula (L.) L.
 Gentiana cruciata L.
 Gentianella amarella (L.) Börner
 Corallorrhiza trifida Chātel.
 Prunella grandiflora (L.) Scholler
 Scutellaria hastifolia L.
 Gladiolus imbricatus L.
 Salix lapponum L.
 Campanula bononiensis L.
 Cypripedium calceolus L.
 Trichophorum cespitosum (L.) C. Hartm.
 Alyssum gmelinii Jord.
 Hammarbya paludosa (L.) Kuntze
 Thesium ebracteatum Hayne
 Sesleria caerulea (L.) Ard.
 Glyceria lithuanica (Gorski) Gorski
 Pulicaria vulgaris Gaertn.
 Silene chlorantha (Willd.) Ehrh.
 Triglochin maritimum L.
 Polemonium caeruleum L.
 Coeloglossum viride (L.) Hartm.
 Gymnadenia conopsea (L.) R. Br.
 Najas marina L.
 Liparis loeselii (L.) Rich.
 Primula farinosa L.
 Cladium mariscus (L.) Pohl
 Agrostemma githago L.
 Corydalis cava (L.) Schweigg. & Körte
 Epipactis atrorubens (Hoffm.) Besser
 Prunus spinosa L.
 Eremogone saxatilis L.
 Eriophorum gracile W. D. J. Koch ex Roth
 Pinguicula vulgaris L.
 Saxifraga hirculus L.
 Cirsium heterophyllum (L.) Hill
 Ajuga pyramidalis L.
 Ranunculus reptans L.
 Carex tomentosa L.
 Iris sibirica L.
 Trisetum sibiricum Rupr.

3(R) - Rare
 Astrantia major L.
 Quercus petraea L. ex Liebl.
 Laserpitium prutenicum L.
 Allium angulosum L.
 Allium scorodoprasum L.
 Bromopsis ramosa (Huds.) Holub
 Agrimonia procera Wallr.
 Trifolium rubens L.
 Trifolium lupinaster L.
 Alisma lanceolatum With.
 Alisma gramineum Lej.
 Orobanche reticulata Wallr.
 Festuca altissima All.
 Dactylorhiza ochroleuca (Wüstnei ex Boll) Holub
 Cnidium dubium (Schkuhr) Thell.
 Chaerophyllum hirsutum L.
 Dianthus borbasii Vandas
 Hypericum montanum L.
 Hypericum hirsutum L.
 Salix myrtilloides L.
 Cardamine flexuosa With.
 Cardamine bulbifera (L.) Crantz
 Campanula cervicaria L.
 Koeleria delavignei Czern. ex Domin
 Lithospermum officinale L.
 Cruciata laevipes Opiz
 Cruciata glabra (L.) Ehrend.
 Pilosella echioides (Lumn.) F. W. Schultz & Sch. Bip.
 Calamagrostis pseudophragmites (Haller f.) Koeller
 Galium rubioides L.
 Bolboschoenus maritimus (L.) Palla
 Nuphar pumilum (Timm) DC.
 Conioselinum tataricum Hoffm.
 Isolepis setacea (L.) R. Br.
 Scolochloa festucacea (Willd.) Link
 Ceratophyllum submersum L.
 Stachys recta L.
 Swertia perennis L.
 Lathyrus laevigatus (Waldst. & Kit.) Gren.
 Lathyrus pisiformis L.
 Pulmonaria angustifolia L.
 Potamogeton ×meinshauzenii Juz.
 Potamogeton acutifolius Link
 Helictotrichon pratense (L.) Besser
 Callitriche hermaphroditica L.
 Tragopogon gorskianus Rchb. f.
 Nasturtium officinale W. T. Aiton
 Corydalis intermedia (L.) Mérat
 Tanacetum corymbosum (L.) Sch. Bip.
 Aira praecox L.
 Geranium lucidum L.
 Myrica gale L.
 Salvia pratensis L.
 Sherardia arvensis L.
 Zannichellia palustris L.
 Colchicum autumnale L.
 Veronica polita Fr.
 Veronica hederifolia L.
 Vicia dumetorum L.
 Vicia lathyroides L.
 Vicia pisiformis L.
 Carex heleonastes Ehrh.
 Carex buxbaumii Wahlenb.
 Carex distans L.
 Carex pseudobrizoides Clavaud
 Juncus capitatus Weigel
 Gagea pratensis (Pers.) Dumort.
 Radiola linoides Roth
 Scabiosa columbaria L.

4(I) - Indeterminate
 Beckmannia eruciformis (L.) Host
 Festuca psammophila (Hack. ex Čelak.) Fritsch
 Common spotted orchid (Dactylorhiza fuchsii (Druce) Soó)
 Dactylorhiza longifolia (Neuman) Aver.
 Dactylorhiza incarnata (L.) Soó
 Dactylorhiza russowii (Klinge) Holub
 Dactylorhiza traunsteineri (Saut.) Soó
 Cerastium sylvaticum Waldst. & Kit.
 Cerastium brachypetalum N. H. F. Desp. ex Pers.
 Taraxacum balticum Dahlst.
 Taraxacum lissocarpum (Dahlst.) Dahlst.
 Taraxacum suecicum G. E. Haglund
 Astragalus cicer L.
 Montia fontana L.
 Mentha longifolia (L.) Huds.
 Glyceria nemoralis (R. Uechtr.) R. Uechtr. & Körn.
 Silene lithuanica Zapał.
 Polycnemum arvense L.
 Viola elatior Fr.
 Viola uliginosa Besser
 Alopecurus arundinaceus Poir.
 Polygala wolfgangiana Besser ex Ledeb.
 Ornithopus perpusillus L.
 Epipactis purpurata Sm.
 Dactylis polygama Horv.
 Elatine hydropiper L.
 Nymphaea alba L.
 Carex muricata L.
 Carex ligerica J. Gay
 Androsace filiformis Retz.
 Senecio congestus (R. Br.) DC.

5(Rs) - Restored
 Laserpitium latifolium L.
 Platanthera chlorantha (Custer) Rchb.
 Perennial honesty (Lunaria rediviva L.)
 Ramsons (Allium ursinum L.)
 Poa remota Forselles
 Pulsatilla patens (L.) Mill.
 Centunculus minimus L.
 Peplis portula L.
 Arctium nemorosum Lej.
 Cyperus fuscus L.

Pinophyta

0 (Ex) - Extinct species
 Taxus baccata L.

Pteridophyta

0 (Ex) - Extinct species
 Salvinia natans (L.) All.

1(E) - Endangered
 Asplenium trichomanes L.
 Botrychium matricariifolium A. Br. ex Koch.
 B. simplex E. Hitch.
 B. virginianum (L.) Sw.
 Isoetes lacustris L.
 Polystichum aculeatum (L.) Roth.

2(V) - Vulnerable
 Lycopodiella inundata (L.) Holub

3(R) - Rare
 Botrychium multifidum (G. G. Gmel.) Rupr.
 Equisetum telmateia Ehrh.

4(I) - Indeterminate
 Asplenium ruta-muraria L.
 Maidenhair spleenwort (Asplenium trichomanes - ramosum L.)

5(Rs) - Restored
 Northern firmoss (Huperzia selago (L.) Bernh. ex Schrank & Martius)

Liverworts

1(E) - Endangered
 Leiocolea rutheana (Limpr.) K. Müll.
 Lepidozia pearsonii Spruce
 Pallavicinia lyelii (Hook) Carruth.

2(V) - Vulnerable
 Porella platyphylla (L.) Pfeif.
 Scapania paludicola Loeske & K. Müll. Frieb.

3(R) - Rare
 Bazzania trilobata (L.) S. Gray
 Cephalozia catenulata (Huebener) Lindb.
 Ricciocarpos natans (L.) Corda
 Trichocolea tomentella (Ehrh.) Dum.

4(I) - Indeterminate
 Riccia canaliculata Hoffm.
 Riccia huebeneriana Lindenb.
 Barbilophozia attenuata (Mart.) Loeske
 B. barbata (Schmid. ex Schreb.) Loeske
 Fossombronia foveolata Lindb.
 F. wondraczekii (Corda) Dum.
 Frullania tamarisci (L.) Dumort.
 Lophozia collaris (Nees) Dumort.
 L. kunzeana (Huebener) Evans
 L. wenzelii (Nees) Steph.
 Moerckia hibernica (Hook) Gott.
 Phaeoceros laevis (L.) Prosk.
 Scapania curta (Mart.) Dumort.
 Tritomaria exsectiformis (Breidl.)

Moss

0 (Ex) - Extinct species
 Bartramia ithyphylla Brid.

1(E) - Endangered
 Bryum schleicheri Lam. & DC.
 Calliergon richardsonii (Mitt.) Kindb.
 Calliergon trifarium (Web. & Mohr) Kindb.
 Drepanocladus lycopodioides (Brid.) Warnst.
 Dicranum drummondii C. Müll.
 Dicranum viride (Sull. & Lesq.) Lindb.
 Rhytidiadelphus loreus (Hedw.) Warnst.
 Meesia triquetra (Richter) Aongstr.
 Fontinalis dalecarlica Bruch & Schimp.
 Fissidens arnoldii Ruthe
 Antitrichia curtipendula (Hedw.) Brid.
 Orthotrichum lyellii Hook. & Tayl.
 Schistostega pennata (Hedw.) Web. & Mohr
 Pterigynandrum filiforme Hedw.
 Dichodontium pellucidum (Hedw.) Schimp
 Philonotis marchica (Hedw.) Brid.

2(V) - Vulnerable
 Aloina aloides (Schultz.) Kindb.
 Campylium polygamum (Schimp.) J. Lange & C. Jens.
 Amblystegium fluviatile (Hedw.) Bruch & Schimp.
 Amblystegium tenax (Hedw.) C. Jens.
 Rhynchostegium murale (Hedw.) Bruch & Schimp.
 Sphagnum molle Sull.
 Sphagnum platyphyllum (Lindb. ex Braithw.) Sull. ex Warnst.
 Sphagnum inundatum Russow
 Sphagnum wulfianum Girg.
 Sphagnum subnitens Russow & Warnst.
 Fontinalis hypnoides Hartm.
 Neckera pennata Hedw.
 Hamatocaulis vernicosus (Mitt.) Hedenäs
 Paraleucobryum longifolium (Hedw.) Loeske

3(R) - Rare
 Atrichum angustatum (Brid.) Bruch & Schimp.
 Bryum funckii Schwaegr.
 Homomallium incurvatum (Brid.) Loeske
 Trematodon ambiguus (Hedw.) Hornsch.
 Dicranum spurium Hedw.
 Ctenidium molluscum (Hedw.) Mitt.
 Tortella fragilis (Drum.) Limpr.
 Tortula virescens (De Not.) De Not.
 Plagiothecium undulatum (Hedw.) Schimp.
 Gyroweisia tenuis (Hedw.) Schimp.
 Pohlia cruda (Hedw.) Lindb.
 Campylopus introflexus (Hedw.) Brid.
 Callicladium haldanianum (Grev.) Crum.
 Fissidens dubius P. Beauv.
 Tayloria tenuis (Woth.) Schimp.
 Thuidium minutulum (Hedw.) Bruch & al.
 Dicranodontium denudatum (Brid.) Britt.
 Zygodon viridissimus (Dicks.) Brid.
 Weissia squarrosa (Nees & Hornsch.) C. Müll.
 Pogonatum nanum (Hedw.) P. Beauv.

4(I) - Indeterminate
 Campylium elodes (Lindb.) Kindb.
 Campylium protensum (Brid.) Kindb.
 Bryum cyclophyllum (Hedw.) Schimp.
 Bryum knowltonii Barnes
 Amblystegium humile (P. Beauv.) Crundw.
 Didymodon tophaceus (Brid.) Lisa
 Amblyodon dealbatus (Hedw.) Bruch & Schimp.
 Dicranum leioneuron Kindb.
 Rhizomnium pseudopunctatum (Bruch & Schimp.) T. Kop.
 Sphagnum pulchrum Lindb. ex Braithw.
 Sphagnum papillosum Lindb.
 Sphagnum quinquefarium (Lindb. ex Braithw.) Warnst.
 Sphagnum subfulvum Sjörs.
 Sphagnum compactum Lam. & DC.
 Distichium capillaceum (Hedw.) Bruch & Schimp.
 Meesia longiseta Hedw.
 Meesia uliginosa Hedw.
 Neckera crispa Hedw.
 Plagiothecium ruthei Limpr.
 Pottia bryoides (Dicks.) Mitt.
 Pottia davalliana (Sm.) C. Jens.
 Hygrohypnum molle (Hedw.)) Loeske
 Fissidens exilis Hedw.
 Orthotrichum striatum Hedw.
 Philonotis caespitosa Jur.
 Pogonatum aloides (Hedw.) P. Beauv.
 Pterygoneurum ovatum (Hedw.) Dix.

Algae

0 (Ex) - Extinct species
 Chara braunii Gmel.
 Nitella batrachosperma (Reichenb.) A. Braun
 Nitella hyalina (DC.) C. Agardh
 Nitella tenuissima (Desv.) Kütz.
 Nitella translucens (Pers.) C. Agardh

1(E) - Endangered
 Bangia atropurpurea (Roth) C. Agardh
 Chara canescens Desv. & Lois.
 Chara baltica (Fries) Wahlstedt
 Bladder wrack (Fucus vesiculosus L.)
 Lychnothamnus barbatus (Meyen) Leonh.
 Nitella capillaris (Krock.) Gr. & B.-W.
 Nitella gracilis (Smith) C.Agardh
 Tolypella prolifera (A. Braun) Leonh.
 Tolypella nidifica (O. Müll.) Leonh.

2(V) - Vulnerable
 Nitella syncarpa (Thuill.) Chev.

3(R) - Rare
 Nitella mucronata (A. Braun) Miquel

4(I) - Indeterminate
 Chara baueri A. Braun
 Nitella flexilis (L.) C. Agardh

Fungus

0 (Ex) - Extinct species
 Conocybe intrusa (Peck) Sing.
 Microstoma protracta (Fr.) Kanouse
 Laricifomes officinalis (Vill.: Fr.) Kotl. & Pouzar
 Coprinus dunarum Stoll.
 Phallus hadriani Vent.: Pers.
 Dictyophora duplicata (Bosc) Fischer
 Sarcosoma globosum (Schmidel: Fr.) Casp.

1(E) - Endangered
 Peziza ammophila Durrieu & Mont.
 Boletus impolitus Fr.
 Boletus pulverulentus Opat.
 Boletus radicans Pers.: Fr.
 Choiromyces meandriformis Vitt.
 Hygrophorus chrysodon (Batsch: Fr.) Fr.
 Hygrophorus penarius Fr.
 Hygrocybe ovina (Bull.: Fr.) Kühner
 Trichoglossum hirsutum (Fr.) Boud.
 Porphyrellus porphyrosporus (Fr.) Gilb.
 Rhodotus palmatus (Bull.: Fr.) Maire
 Gomphus clavatus (Pers.: Fr.) S. F. Gray
 Pseudoomphalina compressipes (Peck) Sing.
 Hapalopilus salmonicolor (Ber. & Curt.) Pouz
 Amanita regalis (Fr.) Michael
 Melanoleuca turrita (Fr.) Sing.
 Lactarius lignyotus Fr.
 Mutinus caninus (Huds.: Pers.) Fr.
 Leccinum melaneum (Smotl.) Pilat & Dermek
 Grifola frondosa (Dicks.: Fr.) S. F. Gray
 Panus tigrinus (Bull.: Fr.)

2(V) - Vulnerable
 Xerocomus parasiticus (Bull.: Fr.) Quél.
 Tricholoma apium Schaeff.
 Tricholoma batschii Gulden
 Boletopsis leucomelaena (Pers.) Fayod
 Boletinus cavipes (Opat.) Kalchbr.
 Boletus fechtneri Velen.
 Boletus aereus Bull.: Fr.
 Caloscypha fulgens (Pers.: Fr.) Boud.
 Entoloma mougeotii (Fr.) Hesler
 Hygrocybe ingrata Jens. & Moell.
 Suillus placidus (Bon.) Sing.
 Otidea onotica (Pers.: Fr.) Fuckel
 Hohenbuehelia geogenia (DC: Fr.) Sing.
 Melanoleuca causei   Maire
 Lactarius acerrimus Britz.
 Fomitopsis rosea (Alb. & Schw.: Fr.) P. Karst.
 Clavariadelphus pistillaris (L.) Donk
 Dendropolyporus umbellatus (Pers.: Fr.) Jülich
 Inonotus dryadeus (Fr.) Murrill
 Ramaria aurea (Schaeff.: Fr.) Ouél.
 Psathyrella caput-medusae (Fr.) Konrad & Maubl.
 Funalia trogii (Berk. in Trog) Bond. & Sing.
 Asterophora lycoperdoides (Bull.) Ditm. ex S. F. Gray

3(R) - Rare
 Matas Selezniovas  (Krombh.) J. Schröt.
 Dominykas Neciunskas  (O. F. Müll.) Sw. (sin. Verpa digitaliformis Pers.)
 Xerocomus rubellus (Krombh.) Quél.
 Boletus erythropus (Fr.: Fr.) Pers.
 Calocybe ionides (Bull. ex Pers.: Fr.) Donk
 Lingzhi mushroom (Ganoderma lucidum (Fr.) P. Karst.)
 Morchella semilibera DC.
 Morchella elata Fr.: Fr.
 Morchella conica Pers.
 Hydnum rufescens Fr.
 Entoloma madidum (Fr.) Gill.
 Hygrophorus erubescens Fr.: Fr.
 Hygrophorus russula (Scop.: Fr.) Quél.
 Fistulina hepatica (Schaeff.) Fr
 Trametes gibbosa Fr.
 Sparassis crispa (Wulf.) Fr.
 Langermannia gigantea (Batsch: Pers.) Rostk.
 Aurantioporus croceus (Pers.: Fr.) Kotl. & Pouz.
 Leucopaxillus alboalutaceus (Moell. & Schff.) Moell.
 Leucopaxillus compactus (Fr.) Neuh. (L. tricolor (Peck) Kühner)
 Spongipellis spumeus (Sow.: Fr.) Pat.
 Agaricus augustus Fr.
 Agaricus langei (Moell.) Moell.
 Lactarius blennius Fr.
 Lactarius repraesentaneus Britz.
 Pycnoporus cinnabarinus (Jacq.: Fr.) P. Karst.
 Rhodocybe gemina (Fr.) Kuyper & Noordel. (R. truncata (Schaeff.) Sing.)
 Inonotus dryophilus (Berk.) Murrill
 Urnula craterium (Schwein.: Fr.) Fr.
 Hericium coralloides (Scop.: Fr.) S. F. Gray
 Russula aurata (With.) Fr.
 Xerula biennis (Bull.: Fr.) Sing.
 Melanophyllum eyrei (Moser) Sing.
 Lepiota cortinarius J. Lange
 Lepiota hystrix Moell. & J. Lange
 Lepiota fuscovinacea (J. Lange) Moell.
 Lepiota lilacea Bres.
 Lepiota subalba P. D. Orton

4(I) - Indeterminate
 Leucocortinarius bulbiger (Alb. & Schw.) Sing.
 Tricholoma inocyboides Pears.
 Tricholoma ustaloides Romagn.
 Tricholoma viridilutescens Moser
 Albatrellus confluens (Alb. & Schw. : Fr.) Kotl. & Pouzar
 Lentinellus ursinus (Fr.) Kühner
 Lentinellus vulpinus (Fr.) Kühner & Maire
 Hydnum rufescens Fr.
 Xylaria polymorpha (Pers.) Grev.
 Hygrophorus atramentarius  (Secr.) Gaas & Haller
 Hygrophorus camarophyllus (Alb. & Schw.: Fr.) Dumee
 Lactarius piperatus (L.: Fr.) S. F. Gray
 Hydnotrya tulasnei (Berk. & Broome) Berk. & Broome
 Lactarius volemus (Fr.) Fr.
 Gymnopilus junonius (Fries) P.D. Orton
 Trametes suaveolens L.: Fr.
 Trametes pubescens (Schum.: Fr.) Pilat
 Marasmius alliaceus (Jacq.: Fr.) Fr.
 Leucopaxillus giganteus (Fr.) Sing.
 Physisporinus vitreus (Pers.: Fr.) P. Karst.
 Melanoleuca verrucipes (Fr.) Sing.
 Lactarius controversus (Fr.) Fr.
 Lactarius resimus (Fr.: Fr.) Fr.
 Lactarius scrobiculatus (Scop.: Fr.) Fr.
 Phallus hadriani Vent.: Pers.
 Postia floriformis (Quél. in Bres.) Jül.
 Trichaster melanocephalus Czern.
 Phaeolus schweinitzii (Fr.) Pat.
 Pycnoporellus fulgens (Fr.) Donk
 Leccinum decipiens (Sing.) Pilat Dermek
 Lepista luscina (Fr.) Sing.
 Lepista personata (Fr.) Cooke
 Lepista sordida (Fr.) Sing.
 Panus suavissimus (Fr.) Sing.
 Pluteus pellitus (Pers.: Fr.) P. Kumm.
 Cantharellus cinereus Pers.: Fr.
 Pseudocraterellus sinuosus (Fr.) Reid
 Clitocybe maxima (Fr.) P. Kumm.
 Russula grata Britz. (R. laurocerasa Melzer)
 Lepiota alba (Bres.) Sacc.
 Lepiota kuehneri Huijsm.
 Geastrum indicum (Klotzsch) St. Rauschert
 Geastrum quadrifidum Pers.

Lichen

0 (Ex) - Extinct species
 Arctoparmelia centrifuga (L.) Hale
 Hypogymnia vittata (Ach.) Parrique
 Solorina spongiosa (Ach.) Anzi
 Usnea glabrata (Ach.) Vain.
 Usnea lapponica Vain.
 Usnea scabrata Nyl.
 Anaptychia runcinata (With.) J. R. Laundon
 Calicium quercinum Pers.
 Chaenotheca hispidula (Ach.) Zahlbr.
 Nephroma resupinatum (L.) Ach.
 Cladonia turgida Hoffm.
 Peltigera aphthosa (L.) Willd.
 Peltigera venosa (L.) Hoffm.
 Peltigera degenii Gyeln.
 Punctelia subrudecta (Nyl.) Krog
 Usnea florida (L.) Weber ex F. H. Wigg.

1(E) - Endangered
 Cladonia caespiticia (Pers.) Flörke
 Evernia divaricata (L.) Ach.
 Chaenotheca cinerea (Pers.) Tibell
 Arthonia leucopellaea (Ach.) Almq.
 Usnea fulvoreagens (Räsänen) Räsänen
 Collema flaccidum (Ach.) Ach.
 Evernia mesomorpha Nyl.
 Flavoparmelia caperata (L.) Hale
 Leptogium corniculatum (Hoffm.) Minks
 Melanelia panniformis (Nyl.) Essl.
 Phaeophyscia endophoenicea (Harm.) Moberg
 Peltigera horizontalis (Huds.) Baumg.
 Ramalina subfarinacea (Nyl. ex Cromb.) Nyl.
 Ramalina thrausta (Ach.) Nyl.

2(V) - Vulnerable
 Lobaria pulmonaria (L.) Hoffm.
 Arthonia didyma Körb.
 Arthonia vinosa Leight.
 Cetrelia olivetorum (Nyl.) W. L. Culb. & C. F. Culb
 Umbilicaria polyphylla (L.) Baumg
 Lasallia pustulata (L.) Mérat
 Umbilicaria deusta (L.) Baumg.
 Fellhanera bouteillei (Desm.) Vezda
 Lecanora albella (Pers.) Ach.
 Menegazzia terebrata (Hoffm.) A. Massal.
 Peltigera lepidophora (Nyl. ex Vain.)
 Rhizocarpon viridiatrum (Wulfen) Körb.

3(R) - Rare
 Chaenotheca brachypoda (Ach.) Tibell
 Chaenotheca chlorella (Ach.) Müll. Arg.
 Cladonia foliacea (Huds.) Willd.
 Diploschistes muscorum (Scop.) R. Sant.
 Hypotrachyna revoluta (Flörke) Hale
 Pertusaria pertusa (Weigel) Tuck.
 Ramalina baltica Lettau
 Rhizocarpon geographicum (L.) DC.

4(I) - Indeterminate
 Usnea glabrescens (Nyl. ex Vain.) Vain.
 Bryoria implexa (Hoffm.) Brodo & D. Hawksw.
 Bryoria nadvornikiana (Gyeln.) Brodo & D. Hawksw.
 Bryoria subcana (Nyl. ex Stizenb.) Brodo & D. Hawksw.
 Pertusaria hemisphaerica (Flörke) Erichsen
 Pertusaria flavida (DC.) J. R. Laundon
 Stereocaulon incrustatum Flörke
 Stereocaulon paschale (L.) Hoffm.
 Icmadophila ericetorum (L.) Zahlbr.

References

E
.
.
Lithuania
Lithuania
Lithuania
.
.
Endangered biota of Europe